Tomas Brindley (born 13 October 2001) is a Scottish professional footballer who plays for Forfar Athletic as a midfielder.

Career
On 22 August 2020, Brindley made his debut for Kilmarnock, as a substitute, in a 2–0 defeat in the Scottish Premiership away to Rangers. He joined Scottish League One side Dumbarton on loan in March 2021. He scored his first senior goal for the Sons on 17 May 2021 in a 3-1 away win against Edinburgh City in the League One playoff final.

On 29 January 2022, Brindley joined Scottish League Two side Forfar Athletic on loan until the end of the season. He joined Forfar on a permanent basis during the 2022 close season.

Career statistics

References

External links
 

2001 births
Living people
Scottish footballers
Kilmarnock F.C. players
Scottish Professional Football League players
Association football midfielders
Dumbarton F.C. players
Forfar Athletic F.C. players